is a Japanese Nippon Professional Baseball pitcher.

External links

Living people
1978 births
People from Naha
Honolulu Sharks players
Japanese expatriate baseball players in the United States
Nippon Professional Baseball pitchers
Osaka Kintetsu Buffaloes players
Tohoku Rakuten Golden Eagles players
Asian Games medalists in baseball
Baseball players at the 2002 Asian Games
Asian Games bronze medalists for Japan
Medalists at the 2002 Asian Games